Narcisse-Édouard Cormier (May 27, 1847 – February 18, 1906) was a merchant and political figure in Quebec. He represented Ottawa electoral district in the Legislative Assembly of Quebec from 1886 to 1887 as a Conservative.

He was born in Saint-Calixte-de-Somerset, Canada East, the son of Olivier Cormier and Emmérence Beaubien. Cormier lived in New Hampshire from 1861 until 1867, when he moved to Aylmer, Quebec and established himself there as a lumber merchant and grocer. Cormier owned a sawmill in Aylmer and a lumber yard in Petawawa, Ontario. He was chief fishing and game warden for west Quebec. He also founded a zoo in Aylmer. He was married twice: to Sophie-Agnès Bourgeau in 1869 and later to Mary Elizabeth Reilly. Cormier was president of the school board and of the local Saint-Jean-Baptiste Society. He served as mayor of Aylmer from 1884 to 1887 and was warden for Ottawa County in 1887. Cormier defeated Alfred Rochon in 1886 to win a seat in the Quebec assembly but the election was overturned and Rochon defeated Cormier in elections held in 1887 and 1890. Cormier died in Aylmer at the age of 57.

References
 

Conservative Party of Quebec MNAs
Mayors of places in Quebec
1847 births
1906 deaths